Durango High School may refer to:
Durango High School (Colorado) in Durango, Colorado
Durango High School (Nevada) in Las Vegas, Nevada